Brendan Ford is a television and repertory actor who has appeared in an episode of the science fiction show Babylon 5, among other shows. He has played the lead on the Los Angeles stage in Brendan Behan's Hostage, Ibsen's A Doll's House, Break of Day, Camelot, and Ernest in Love.

Filmography

References

External links

Year of birth missing (living people)
Living people
American male television actors
Place of birth missing (living people)